Mari Macmillan Ramsay Wilson (born 29 September 1954, Neasden, London) is a British pop and jazz singer. She is best known for her 1982 UK top-10 hit single "Just What I Always Wanted" and her 1960s image complete with beehive hairstyle.

Career
Recording on Compact Records with her backing band The Wilsations, Wilson scored six UK hit singles between 1982 and 1984. Her biggest hit, "Just What I Always Wanted" peaked at No. 8 in the UK Singles Chart in 1982.

In 1983, she scored a second Top 40 hit with a cover of "Cry Me a River" (UK No. 27) and released her debut album Showpeople (UK No. 24). After this, further commercial success eluded her, though in 1985 she recorded the song "Would You Dance with a Stranger" (theme for the film Dance with a Stranger) and turned her career towards live performances. She subsequently distanced herself from her beehive days, but started touring with her old songs again in 2007.

In 1992, her album The Rhythm Romance, which combined jazz standards with 1960s songs and original material, failed to return her to the charts. She continued performing with jazz bands, and she sang the theme song to the sitcom Coupling ("Perhaps, Perhaps, Perhaps"). Her version of "Cry Me a River" was featured in the 1990s crime drama series McCallum.

In 2005, she returned to recording with the album Dolled Up. This was followed by a compilation of her hits The Platinum Collection to celebrate her 25th anniversary in the music industry. Apart from pursuing her solo career, she toured with Barb Jungr and Claire Martin as the cabaret act 'Girl Talk' (though Claire Martin has now been replaced by Gwyneth Herbert).

Wilson has also performed in musicals such as Dusty - The Musical, and has been featured on a BBC Television series about celebrities and their health (she has Type 1 Diabetes).

Her band was known as The Imaginations for their first two singles before becoming The Wilsations, and her backing vocalists were called The Marionettes. Occasional featured artists were Michelle Collins, Julia Fordham and bassist 'Thumbs' Cunningham.

Wilson's fourth studio album Emotional Glamour was released on her own Beehive label in October 2008 (though she has long ago changed her former trademark hairstyle). She has also written and starred in a one-woman musical, The Love Thing.

In 2012, an album of covers called Cover Stories was released, funded by public subscription. She also writes a regular blog about her life and music.

On 30 September 2018, she appeared with Soft Cell, as an unannounced special guest to sing a duet with Marc Almond, as part of their final live concert 'Say Hello and Wave Goodbye, One Last Time' at The O2 Arena in London.

Personal life
Wilson is a longtime resident of Crouch End, north London and is married to TV producer Mal Young. Her parents are from Scotland.

Discography

 Showpeople (1983)
 Rhythm Romance (1991)
 Dolled Up (2005)
 Girl Talk (2006)
 Emotional Glamour (2008)
 Cover Stories (2012)
 Pop Deluxe (2016)

References

1954 births
Living people
Musicians from London
English women singers
People from Neasden
English people of Scottish descent